The 1923 Kentucky Derby was the 49th running of the Kentucky Derby. The race took place on May 19, 1923.

Full results

Winning Breeder: John E. Madden; (KY)
Horses Anna M. Humphrey, Chickvale, and Everhart scratched before the race.

Payout

 The winner received a purse of $53,600 and $5,000 Gold Cup.
 Second place received $6,000.
 Third place received $3,000.
 Fourth place received $1,000.

References

1923
Kentucky Derby
Derby
Kentucky Derby
Kentucky Derby